is a district located in Saga Prefecture, Japan.

As of April 1, 2021, the district has an estimated population of 18,804 and a density of 286 persons per square kilometre.

Towns and villages 
Arita, whose borders are effectively the same as Nishimatsuura District's.

History

Districts in Saga Prefecture